Kenny Rocha Santos (born 3 January 2000) is a Cape Verdean professional footballer who plays as a midfielder for Belgian First Division A club Oostende.

Club career

Saint-Étienne 
Rocha Santos made his debut for Saint-Étienne on 1 February 2017 against Auxerre, replacing Kévin Monnet-Paquet in the 78th minute of a 3–0 away loss in the Coupe de France.

Nancy 
In July 2019, Rocha Santos signed for Nancy. He made his debut for the club in a 1–1 draw against Valenciennes on 2 August. His first goal came in a 2–1 away loss to Caen on 7 November 2020.

International career 
He was named in the roster for the 2021 Africa cup of nations  when the team reached the round of 16..

Career statistics

Club

International

References

External links 
 

2000 births
Living people
People from São Vicente, Cape Verde
Cape Verdean footballers
Association football midfielders
Cape Verde international footballers
AS Saint-Étienne players
AS Nancy Lorraine players
K.V. Oostende players
Championnat National 3 players
Ligue 1 players
Championnat National 2 players
Ligue 2 players
Belgian Pro League players
Cape Verdean expatriate footballers
Expatriate footballers in France
Cape Verdean expatriate sportspeople in France
Expatriate footballers in Belgium
Cape Verdean expatriate sportspeople in Belgium
2021 Africa Cup of Nations players